Longinus may refer to:
 Longinus cross
 Longinus Tower

People 
 male members of the family Cassii Longini
 Gaius Cassius Longinus (c. 85 – 42 BC), Roman senator and leading instigator in the plot to kill Julius Caesar
 Gaius Cassius Longinus (consul AD 30) (1st century), Roman jurist and politician, nephew of the tyrannicide
 Longinus (1st century), name ascribed to the Roman soldier who allegedly pierced the side of Jesus on the cross
 Longinus or Pseudo-Longinus (c. 1st century), conventional names for the author of On the Sublime
 Gnaeus Pompeius Longinus (died 105), Roman general
 Longinus (Roman governor) (fl. 158–161), possible Roman governor of Britain
 Cassius Longinus (philosopher) (c. 213–273), Greek rhetorician and critic
 Saint Longinus (died c. 290), Roman soldier converted to Christianity by Victor of Marseilles
 Longinus (abbot) (fl. 451), Miaphysite monk and saint
 Longinus (consul 486) (fl. 475-491), Roman politician and brother of the emperor Zeno
 Longinus of Cardala (died 497), Roman official and leader during the Isaurian War
 Longinus of Selinus (died 498), Isaurian leader during the Isaurian War
 Longinus (missionary) (fl. 565–580), Byzantine Christian missionary and bishop in Nubia
 Jan Długosz (1415–1480), known in Latin as Johannes Longinus, medieval Polish historian
 Longinus Fernandes, an Indian choreographer and dancer, active 1995–present

Fiction and literature
 Longinus (film), a 2004 Japanese short directed by Ryuhei Kitamura
 Longinus Podbipięta, a character in Henryk Sienkiewicz's novel With Fire and Sword
 Casca Rufio Longinus, a fictional character in Casca (series)
Longinus, a character played by Kevin Daniels in Modern Family.

See also
Cassius Longinus (disambiguation)